Like Father, Like Son, or The Mistaken Brothers is a lost play written by Aphra Behn, first performed by the Duke's Company in 1682.

Behn based her play, a comedy, on Thomas Randolph's The Jealous Lovers (which was printed in 1640 and published in 1643).

Pierre Danchin suggests that the title may allude to a notorious Whig ballad that included the words 'Like father, like son', which was accused of inciting regicide (Behn herself was a royalist).

Like Father, Like Son proved to be such a failure with audiences that it was the only one of Behn's plays never to be printed. All that survives are its prologue and epilogue, which were printed in 1682.

References 

1682 plays
Plays by Aphra Behn
Lost plays